SPH may refer to:

 Rutgers School of Public Health
 School of Public Health (Imperial College London)
 Sekolah Pelita Harapan, schools in Jakarta, Indonesia
 Shanghai Pharmaceuticals
 Small penis humiliation
 Smoothed particle hydrodynamics
 Singapore Press Holdings
 SPH Media Trust
 SPH MediaWorks
 Sphingomyelin
 Self-propelled howitzer as a form of self-propelled artillery